Herbert Stephenson Boreman (September 21, 1897 – March 26, 1982) was a United States circuit judge of the United States Court of Appeals for the Fourth Circuit and previously was a United States district judge of the United States District Court for the Northern District of West Virginia.

Education and career

Born in Middlebourne, West Virginia, Boreman received a Bachelor of Laws from West Virginia University College of Law in 1920. He was in private practice in Parkersburg, West Virginia, 1920 to 1923, thereafter serving as both an Assistant United States Attorney and as a divorce commissioner for the Wood County Circuit Court of West Virginia from 1923 to 1927, before returning to private practice until 1929. He was Prosecutor for Wood County, West Virginia from 1929 to 1932. From 1932 to 1954, he was again in private practice, also serving as a member of the West Virginia Senate from 1942 to 1950. Boreman ran for Governor of West Virginia in 1948, as a Republican but lost to Democrat Okey L. Patteson, receiving just under 43% of the vote.

Federal judicial service

Boreman was nominated by President Dwight D. Eisenhower on June 22, 1954, to a seat on the United States District Court for the Northern District of West Virginia vacated by Judge William E. Baker. He was confirmed by the United States Senate on July 21, 1954, and received his commission on July 22, 1954. His service terminated on June 22, 1959, due to his elevation to the Fourth Circuit.

Boreman received a recess appointment to the United States Court of Appeals for the Fourth Circuit on October 17, 1958, but declined the appointment. Boreman was nominated by President Eisenhower on January 20, 1959, to a seat on the United States Court of Appeals for the Fourth Circuit vacated by Judge John J. Parker. He was confirmed by the Senate on June 16, 1959, and received his commission on June 17, 1959. He assumed senior status on June 15, 1971. His service terminated on March 26, 1982, due to his death in Parkersburg.

References

Sources
 

1897 births
1982 deaths
20th-century American lawyers
County prosecuting attorneys in West Virginia
Judges of the United States Court of Appeals for the Fourth Circuit
Judges of the United States District Court for the Northern District of West Virginia
Politicians from Parkersburg, West Virginia
People from Tyler County, West Virginia
United States court of appeals judges appointed by Dwight D. Eisenhower
20th-century American judges
United States district court judges appointed by Dwight D. Eisenhower
West Virginia lawyers
Republican Party West Virginia state senators
West Virginia University College of Law alumni
Assistant United States Attorneys
Boreman family